The 1990 season of the Tongatapu Inter Club Championship was the 17th season of top flight association football competition in Tonga. Ngeleʻia FC won the championship for the eighth time.

Teams 
 Halapili
 Houmakelikao
 Houmakelikao B
 Muniao
 Navutoka
 Navutoka B
 Veitongo FC
 'Atenisi United
 Ngeleʻia FC
 Va'epopua
 British Petroleum

References 

Tonga Major League seasons
1990 in Tongan sport